The Nolloth Professor of the Philosophy of the Christian Religion is a chair at the University of Oxford, associated with Oriel College. The chair was established in 1920 by an endowment from Charles Frederick Nolloth, on the basis of lectures delivered by Clement Webb. The post holder is to "lecture and give instruction in the Philosophy of the Christian Religion including Apologetics, that is, the setting forth of the reasonableness as well as the authority of the Christian Religion, and shall generally promote the study of those subjects in the University."

List of Nolloth Professors
 1920–1930 Clement Webb
 1930?–1951 Laurence Grensted
 1951–1966 Ian Ramsey
 1968–1985 Basil Mitchell
 1985–2003 Richard Swinburne
 2003–2018 Brian Leftow
 Since 2020 Mark Wynn

References

 
Philosophy of the Christian Religion, Nolloth
1920 establishments in England
Oriel College, Oxford
Philosophy of the Christian Religion, Nolloth
Lists of people associated with the University of Oxford